František Mareš (20 October 1857 – 6 February 1942) was a Czechoslovak professor of physiology and philosophy, and a nationalist politician. He was rector of the Charles University in 1920–21, and a member of the National Democrats.

Life
Mareš was born in Opatovice. He studied philosophy and medicine in Prague (postgraduate in Vienna), graduating in 1886. He became a professor in 1890. He became a chairman of the Physiology Institute of the Charles University in 1895, continuing in that capacity until 1928. In 1914 and 1920, he was appointed rector of the Charles University for one year. He was many times appointed dean of Faculty of Medicine. He held an honorary doctorate from the Mayo clinic.

During the war and after the independence of Czechoslovakia from Austria-Hungary in 1918, Mareš became active in the Czechoslovak nationalist movement. He was an active member of the National Democrats, and became a member of the Revolutionary National Assembly of Czechoslovakia in 1918. In 1920, he was elected to the Senate, until the next election of 1925. At that time he became influenced by fascism, much to the dismay of the National Democratic leadership. In 1934, he was part of the leadership of the National Front (Národní fronta), later National Unity (Národní sjednocení). He was also a contributor to Vlajka.

He died in České Budějovice and was entombed in Hluboká nad Vltavou.

Work
Mareš published his research papers mainly in German and French journals. The papers were oriented on metabolism, neurophysiology and winter dormancy in rodents. For medical students he prepared textbooks Všeobecná fysiologie and Fysiologie I-IV. His philosophy was briefly based upon the Vitalism of Henri Bergson and Hans Driesch. He was a critic of positivism, reflected in his book Idealism and Realism in Natural Sciences (1903). He also defended the Rukopis královédvorský, which were later exposed as forgeries by scientific dating methods.

References

External links 

 

1857 births
1942 deaths
People from České Budějovice District
People from the Kingdom of Bohemia
Czechoslovak National Democracy politicians
Vlajka politicians
Members of the Revolutionary National Assembly of Czechoslovakia
Members of the Senate of Czechoslovakia (1920–1925)
Czech philosophers
Charles University alumni
Academic staff of Charles University